Streptomyces luteogriseus is a bacterium species from the genus of Streptomyces. Streptomyces luteogriseus produces peliomycin and (+)-(S)-streptonol A.

Further reading

See also 
 List of Streptomyces species

References

External links
Type strain of Streptomyces luteogriseus at BacDive -  the Bacterial Diversity Metadatabase

luteogriseus
Bacteria described in 1964